Marco Andrea Longhi (born 22 April 1967) is a British property entrepreneur and Conservative Party politician who has served as the Member of Parliament for Dudley North since 2019.

Early life
Longhi grew up in Rome, the son of an Italian airline worker. He trained as a pilot and later studied at Manchester University, following this by working for a time in civil engineering. He then worked in the oil and gas industry, which included five years in South America.

Political career
In 1999, Longhi was elected as a Conservative councillor in Walsall (where his grandfather Wilfred Clarke had been Mayor in 1978), and became Mayor in 2017 and again in 2018. In the 2005 general election he ran for election in Dudley South, gaining an increased vote share but losing to the Labour incumbent by around 4,000 votes.

He ran in Dudley North at the 2019 general election, gaining the seat after the incumbent, Ian Austin (independent, formerly Labour), stood down. He is the first Conservative to represent Dudley North, which had previously returned a Labour candidate since its creation.

On 22 April 2020, during the COVID-19 pandemic, he became the first ever MP to speak in the Commons chamber via remote video link, asking a question of the Wales Secretary, Simon Hart.

Following an interim report on the connections between colonialism and properties in the care of the National Trust, including links with historic slavery, Longhi was among the signatories of a letter to The Daily Telegraph in November 2020 from the "Common Sense Group" of Conservative parliamentarians. The letter accused the National Trust of being "coloured by cultural Marxist dogma, colloquially known as the 'woke agenda'".

On 23 August 2021, Prime Minister Boris Johnson appointed Longhi as the UK's trade envoy to Brazil.

In May 2022, Longhi called for “Stop Brexit Man” Steve Bray to be “locked up in the Tower with a loudspeaker playing "Land of Hope and Glory" on repeat at maximum volume” because of the disruption he causes. He added that Bray was “griping for any little bit of press coverage” and claimed that staff in his Westminster office could not hear “distressed constituents on the phone” because of the loud music that Bray played.

In June 2022, Longhi, in a private message directed to the Archbishop of Canterbury Justin Welby, about the government's Rwanda asylum plan, said, "Archbishop, as you appear to feel so strongly about this, will you give up two of your palaces for illegal migrants and pay for their accommodation?"

Longhi endorsed Kemi Badenoch during the July 2022 Conservative Party leadership election. After Badenoch was eliminated, he backed Liz Truss.

In October 2022, following the resignation of Liz Truss as Prime Minister, Longhi announced that he would be supporting previous Prime Minister Boris Johnson in the subsequent leadership election.

Business career
Longhi was the director of property management company Justmove (Lettings) Limited, and owns ten houses in Walsall.

References

External links

 Official website
 

Living people
UK MPs 2019–present
British real estate businesspeople
British politicians of Italian descent
English people of Italian descent
Conservative Party (UK) MPs for English constituencies
Conservative Party (UK) councillors
Mayors of places in the West Midlands (county)
People from Walsall
People from Dudley
Politicians from Rome
1967 births